Maine Central Railroad began operating diesel locomotives in 1935, and had retired all steam locomotives by 1954. That time interval was a joint operating period with the Boston and Maine Railroad (B&M). This article describes diesel locomotives owned by Maine Central through the period of joint operation and later independent operation prior to Guilford Rail System control in 1981.

Locomotive purchasing history
Maine Central made annual purchases of new steam locomotives from 1899 through 1920. Changing economic climate following World War I terminated routine annual purchases. Economic restructuring in the early 1920s included purchasing a few modern steam locomotives in 1923 and 1924 while eliminating subsidiary branch lines serving Bridgton, Belfast and Franklin County. J. G. Brill Company  Model 55 gasoline-powered baggage-mail motor car number 700 was purchased in 1922 and scrapped in 1930. Attempts to offer passenger service enticing people off Maine roads included purchase of the last two new steam locomotives in 1930 followed by joint purchase of the Budd Company Flying Yankee streamliner in 1935. Two gasoline-powered switchers were purchased while exploring options to decrease operating costs through the Great Depression. Maine Central number 1 was Whitcomb Locomotive Works builders number 12981 built in 1929, acquired in 1932 and sold to National Fireworks Company in 1941. Number 2 was Plymouth Locomotive Works builders number 3957 built in 1938 and sold to New England Shipbuilding Corporation in 1942.

Maine Central's first wholly owned diesel-electric locomotive was an Ingersoll Rand  railcar built as demonstrator OE-600 in 1933. The rear of the railcar included railway post office and baggage compartments. The railcar became Maine Central number 901 in 1935; and pulled a coach or two over the eastern division between Bangor, Maine and Vanceboro, Maine until 1947. It then spent two years pulling Rumford Branch passenger trains before conversion to unpowered maintenance of way tool car number 950.

Paint schemes

Diesel locomotives were painted black with white lettering through World War II. Road engines built through the period of joint operation shared the B&M paint scheme of maroon with gold stripes first applied to B&M EMD FTs. Only the Maine Central lettering and herald were different. Maine Central followed B&M practice of applying horizontal red stripes outlined in white across the nose of black ALCO and General Electric switchers after B&M purchased ALCO RS-2 demonstrator number 1500 wearing that paint scheme in May, 1948.

The period of joint operations ended in 1953 when Maine Central established separate corporate headquarters in Portland, Maine, and modified the road engine paint scheme by retaining the gold stripe pattern while substituting forest green for the B&M maroon background color. Only two ALCO RS-3s, two ALCO RS-11s, a single EMD SW9 and the last four EMD GP7s were delivered wearing green and gold, but several road switchers and most of the EMD E7s and F3s were later repainted in that scheme. ALCO S-4s delivered in 1954 were painted in a simplified green paint scheme with yellow lettering and fewer stripes. Most of the ALCO road switchers, S-4 number 313, S-1s 954 and 958, 44-ton switcher 11, and GP7s 564, 566, 569 and 571 were later repainted in the less complex green scheme.

EMD GP38s replacing older cab units in 1966 introduced new safety yellow paint schemes. The GP38s were painted yellow with green lettering. Similar yellow paint schemes were applied to all subsequent road switcher purchases until Guilford control. Most of the GP7s were similarly repainted beginning in 1972. RS-11s 801 and 802 were painted yellow in 1977 and 1981, respectively. Yellow paint covered the formerly striped noses of many ALCO switchers, although cabs and hoods remained black.

Class DS yard switchers
Maine Central purchased two ALCO HH series locomotives in 1939 after observing operation of earlier purchases of these switchers by subsidiary Portland Terminal Company. Ten similar ALCO S-1 and S-3s were purchased by 1953. These switchers worked in the larger yards and replaced 4-6-0s on the Harmony branch. Maine Central also purchased seven GE 44-ton switchers between 1941 and 1947 for use in Augusta, Brunswick, Livermore Falls, Vanceboro, Eastport, and the unconnected upper and lower yards at Lewiston. The Brunswick assignment proved too heavy for a 44-ton switcher; but they eliminated need for firemen and 0-6-0 maintenance crews in the remaining locations. The  ALCO switchers served as summer replacements when the 44-ton switchers required maintenance; but the ALCOs lacked electric hood heaters which allowed the 44-ton switchers to sleep in unheated engine houses through winter months without freezing the engine blocks. ALCOs replaced 44-ton switchers at some locations in the mid 1970s; but light rail on the Eastport branch required a 44-ton switcher until service to Eastport was discontinued in 1978.

Class DP (EMD E7A)
Maine Central purchased seven EMD E7s in 1946 and 1948 to operate in a power pool with B&M E7s for passenger service between B&M points south of Portland and Maine Central points north of Portland. The first four were part of a cancelled order for the Rock Island Railroad; and operated for a few months wearing a Rock Island paint scheme with Maine Central lettering. Maine Central soon repainted the Rock Island E7s to match the B&M paint scheme with Maine Central lettering. Two of the E7s were scrapped when Maine Central terminated passenger service in 1960. The remaining five pulled mail and express trains on the former Gull schedule. They were sold to the Kansas City Southern Railroad (KCS) when the Gull express service ended in 1963.

Class DF (EMD F3)
In 1947 and 1948, Maine Central purchased eight EMD F3As and two F3Bs as their first diesel freight locomotives. Class DF-3 were built with "chicken wire" grills and steam generators for possible use on passenger trains; but all Maine Central F3s spent most of their lives pulling freight trains on the main line and Mountain Division. Class DF-4 had the EMD F7-style grills and were sometimes called F5s. The F3s were traded in for EMD GP38s in 1966.

Class DS branch line switchers
Maine Central purchased three ALCO S-2s in 1949 to handle heavy cuts of freight cars in the Bangor and Waterville yards similar to the work Portland Terminal Company S2s were doing in the Rigby Yard at the southern end of the Maine Central main line. Class DS-4b S-2s also worked in Rockland and Rumford. Class DS-4d were similar but equipped for multiple-unit (MU) operation to pull branch line freight trains. Four S-4s delivered in 1954 were the only green Maine Central ALCO switchers until numbers 313, 954 and 958 were similarly repainted.

Four maroon and gold MU-equipped EMD SW7s purchased in 1950 and 1951, and a similar green and gold SW9 purchased in 1953 became Maine Central class DS-5. These EMD switchers worked as helpers and local freight engines on the Mountain Division until 1958. They then handled local freights out of Portland until being assigned to Bangor in 1966 for Bucksport Branch freight trains.

Class DRS road switchers
Purchase of maroon and gold road switchers began with five ALCO RS-2s in 1949. Maine Central then purchased five class DRS-3b EMD GP7s with dynamic brakes for freight service, and ten class DRS-3b with steam generators for passenger service. In 1953 Maine Central purchased four green and gold GP7s with dynamic brakes and two green and gold ALCO RS-3s with steam generators. All steam locomotives were retired by 1954, but Maine Central purchased two green and gold ALCO RS-11s in 1956 to meet operational requirements after experience demonstrated diesel locomotive maintenance needs and availability. A class DRS-3d maroon and gold GP7 with steam generator but no MU equipment was acquired in 1957. Portland Terminal Company had been using the GP7 as a mileage equalizer pulling commuter trains out of North Station until replaced by Budd Rail Diesel Cars.

After some experimentation in other locations, the ALCO road switchers were based at Bangor and usually worked on the eastern division between Bangor and the New Brunswick border. Steam generators were removed from most of the EMD GP7s as their assignments became increasingly focused on freight trains west of Bangor. Steam generators were retained on GP7s 571 through 574 after regularly scheduled passenger service ended in 1960. Through the 1960s these four GP7s pulled extra trains of New Haven Railroad coaches carrying children to summer camps in Maine.

Three of the RS-2s were traded in for GP38s in 1966. GP7s started working on the eastern division when thirteen new GP38s were delivered in 1966 and 1967. GP7s replaced remaining ALCO RS-2s and RS-3s when ten new GE U18Bs arrived in 1975. The U18Bs were individually named after Maine personalities and places of the American Revolutionary War in recognition of the United States Bicentennial. Maine Central was one of two railroads in America to purchase the U18B. The U18Bs were noted for having reliability issues and being underpowered.

After the bicentennial, Maine Central began purchasing used locomotives including fourteen GE U25Bs from the liquidated Rock Island Railroad. Five of the U25Bs were cannibalized for parts to make the remaining nine operational. Availability of nine U25Bs for freight service allowed GP7s to replace the remaining ALCO switchers for yard assignments.

References

Notes

Electro-Motive Diesel locomotives
ALCO locomotives
General Electric locomotives
Maine Central Railroad

Standard gauge locomotives of the United States